The 2014 Indian general elections was held in Punjab on 30 April 2014, making it the seventh phase of the elections.

List of candidates

Results

Elected MPs 
Keys:

Bye-elections

Assembly segments wise lead of Parties

References

Indian general elections in Punjab, India
2010s in Punjab, India
Punjab